Dmitrii Bartasinskii (born 19 January 1995) is a Russian Paralympic swimmer who represented Russian Paralympic Committee athletes at the 2020 Summer Paralympics.

Career
Bartasinskii represented Russian Paralympic Committee athletes at the 2020 Summer Paralympics in the men's 100 metre breaststroke SB9 and won a bronze medal.

References

1995 births
Living people
Medalists at the World Para Swimming Championships
Medalists at the World Para Swimming European Championships
Sportspeople from Volgograd
Paralympic swimmers of Russia
Swimmers at the 2020 Summer Paralympics
Medalists at the 2020 Summer Paralympics
Paralympic medalists in swimming
Paralympic bronze medalists for the Russian Paralympic Committee athletes
Russian male breaststroke swimmers
S10-classified Paralympic swimmers
21st-century Russian people